The Gilroy Dispatch is an American weekly newspaper published in Gilroy, California.

History
The Gilroy Dispatch traces its lineage to the Gilroy Advocate, which published from September 12, 1868 to April 28, 1949. 
In 1925, John N. Hall and Thomas Losey started the competing The Advocate, a six-day daily. 
In 1930, Hall sold his interest in the Dispatch to Lloyd E. Smith, who also bought the Advocate and merged it with the Gilroy Evening Dispatch. Smith published the Dispatch until 1939.

George R. Kane, Patrick H. Peabody and Joseph Hoeteling purchased The Dispatch in 1949 from George W. Werner, its publisher since 1941. Kane’s group sold the publication to Jerry Fuchs and Millard Hoyle in March 1972. McClatchy Newspapers Inc. purchased it from Fuchs and Hoyle in August 1978. At the time of the sale it published three days a week and had a reported circulation of 6500.

On February 28, 1997, McClatchy sold the Dispatch, along with the Hollister Free Lance, the Morgan Hill Times and the Amador Ledger, for $6.7 million to Independent Newspapers Ltd. of New Zealand. McClatchy’s filing with the U.S. Security and Exchange Commission reported a combined daily circulation of approximately 10,150, weekly circulation of 12,800 and $7.5 million in annual revenues for the year preceding the sale. Independent’s largest shareholder was Australia-based News Ltd., controlled by billionaire publisher Rupert Murdoch.

The New Zealand group sold the papers in 1998 to Central Valley Publishing Holdings, Inc., an operator of 30 small market papers that was based in Festus, Missouri. Michigan publishers Anthony Allegretti and Steve Staloch gained control of Central Valley's assets in a 2004 private equity-backed management buyout, assembling a group that included community newspapers in San Diego County, Santa Cruz and California's Central Valley. 

Staloch and Allegretti left the company in 2013 and controlling shareholder, The Brookside Group of Stamford, CT, put its California newspapers on the market, selling its San Diego group in November.

Return to Local Ownership

Silicon Valley-based Metro Newspapers, headed by Dan Pulcrano, purchased the Mainstreet’s four remaining weeklies, including the Dispatch, in April 2014, marking the first time the Dispatch had been owned by a publisher based in the region in 36 years.

South Valley Magazine
The Dispatch and its sister paper, the Morgan Hill Times, launched South Valley magazine on July 15, 2016. The publication is home-delivered with the newspapers and distributed free at locations in the communities.  

Its logo was drawn by typographer Mark Davis and art directed by Roger Black.

Return to Downtown
After decades in a building at the south end of Monterey Ave., the Dispatch returned to downtown in August 2016, moving its offices to 64 W 6th St.

Awards 

The Gilroy Dispatch won 11 awards over a broad range of news categories, including three first-place awards, in the 2004 annual California Newspaper Publishers Association’s Better Newspapers Contest.
It won two first place awards and four second place awards in the 2012 competition.

In 2015, the Dispatch won awards for agricultural reporting and front page design.

References 

Gilroy, California
Newspapers published in the San Francisco Bay Area
1925 establishments in California
Publications established in 1925
Weekly newspapers published in California